Novaya Melnitsa is a rural locality (a selo) in Ostrogozhsk, Ostrogozhsky District, Voronezh Oblast, Russia. The population was 316 as of 2010. There are 8 streets.

Geography 
Novaya Melnitsa is located 12 km southwest of Ostrogozhsk (the district's administrative centre) by road. Gniloye is the nearest rural locality.

References 

Rural localities in Ostrogozhsky District